The Escape may refer to:

Film and television
 The Escape (1914 film), American silent film directed by D. W. Griffith
 The Escape (1926 film), American silent film 
 The Escape (1928 film), American film 
 The Escape (1939 film), American film 
 The Escape (1972 film), Hong Kong film directed by Peter Yang Kwan
 The Escape (1998 film), Canadian action film directed by Stuart Gillard
 The Escape (2009 film), Danish film
 The Escape (2016 film), a short film by BMW Studios
 The Escape (2017 film), British film
 "The Escape", third episode of the 1964 Doctor Who serial The Daleks
 "The Escape" (The O.C.), episode of The O.C.
 "The Escape", an episode from the first season of MacGyver

Literature
 The Escape (Animorphs), novel in the Animorphs series by K. A. Applegate
 The Escape, the first novel in the Henderson's Boys series by Robert Muchamore
 The Escape, the second novel in the Star Trek: Voyager novel series
 The Escape (Baldacci novel), the third John Puller novel by David Baldacci, published in 2014

Music
 The Escape (band), 1980s British post-punk-goth band

See also 
 Escape (disambiguation)
 The Great Escape (disambiguation)